Laurie Kern (born 6 February 1957) is a Canadian female former track and field athlete who competed in the javelin throw. She was a bronze medallist at the 1978 Commonwealth Games, held in Canada, and the winner at the Liberty Bell Classic in 1980 (an event held as an alternative to the Olympics due to a boycott). She was a three-time national javelin champion.

Raised in Richmond, British Columbia, she took part in javelin from a young age, breaking all club records at the local Kajaks track and field club.

She twice represented Canada at the Pan American Games, finishing fourth at both the 1975 and 1979 events.

International competitions

National titles
Canadian Track and Field Championships
Javelin throw: 1973, 1979, 1980

References

Living people
1957 births
People from Richmond, British Columbia
Sportspeople from British Columbia
Canadian female javelin throwers
Commonwealth Games medallists in athletics
Athletes (track and field) at the 1978 Commonwealth Games
Pan American Games track and field athletes for Canada
Athletes (track and field) at the 1975 Pan American Games
Athletes (track and field) at the 1979 Pan American Games
Commonwealth Games bronze medallists for Canada
20th-century Canadian women
21st-century Canadian women
Medallists at the 1978 Commonwealth Games